The 2018 AFC Women's Asian Cup Final was a football match at the Amman International Stadium in Amman, Jordan which determined the winner of the 2018 AFC Women's Asian Cup. The final was contested between Japan and Australia, teams which were also the finalists of the previous edition held in 2014.

Japan defeated Australia 1–0 in the final to win their second consecutive title.

Background
Japan were the defending champions of the AFC Women's Asian Cup having defeated Australia in the final of the 2014 edition in Vietnam to win their first continental title. The two sides had met in the group stage of the 2018 AFC Women's Asian Cup. Their encounter ended in a 1–1 draw.

The match also marked Australia's third consecutive appearance in a Women's Asian Cup final. This feat was last achieved by China which featured in the final of the 2003, 2006, and 2008 editions.

Australia's previous victory against Japan in a major tournament was their match up at the 2010 AFC Women's Asian Cup in Vietnam, where it knockout their East Asian opposition out of the semifinals and win the title. Australia has been beaten by Japan since then including their quarter final loss in the 2015 FIFA Women's World Cup.

Route to the final

Australia and Japan were both part of Group B in the group stage. Australia finished as group leaders and had to face second-placers Thailand in the semifinal while Japan had to play against China, the Group A leaders. The semifinalists of the tournament including Australia and Japan secured a berth at the 2019 FIFA Women's World Cup by finishing among the top two teams in their group.

Australia was trailing 1–2 to Thailand in their semifinal tie before Australia made an equalizer just before the end of the regulation time. This meant that the match had to go to extra time but no further goals were made and penalty shoot-out was held to determine which among the two teams to advance to the final. Australia outscored Thailand in the penalties. Japan won over China in the other semifinal with the sole Chinese goal being scored from a penalty kick in the 90th minute.

Match
Australian winger Hayley Raso, right knee injury, was ruled out of the Final.

In the first half, Australia had a chance to score when they were awarded a penalty after Saki Kumagai handled Tameka Butt’s shot at goal in the 14th minute, but Ayaka Yamashita saved the penalty from Elise Kellond-Knight.

In the 84th minute, substitute Kumi Yokoyama received the ball from Yui Hasegawa and shot the ball into the top corner of the net from 18 yards scoring the winning goal.

Details

Aftermath
Japan won their second AFC Women's Asian Cup title. Japan's win also marks the first time a national team won the continental title two times consecutively, a feat last done North Korea who emerged champions of the 2001 and 2003 editions. It was also the first title won by Japan women's team under the tutelage of manager, Asako Takakura and the third major title within the last seven years.

References

Final
Australia women's national soccer team matches
2018
Australia–Japan sports relations